Raffaelea subfusca is a mycangial fungus, first isolated from female adults of the redbay ambrosia beetle, Xyleborus glabratus.

References

Further reading
Dreaden, Tyler J., et al. "Phylogeny of ambrosia beetle symbionts in the genus Raffaelea." Fungal biology 118.12 (2014): 970–978. 
Harrington, Thomas C., et al. "Isolations from the redbay ambrosia beetle, Xyleborus glabratus, confirm that the laurel wilt pathogen, Raffaelea lauricola, originated in Asia." Mycologia 103.5 (2011): 1028–1036. 
Inácio, M. Lurdes, et al. "Ophiostomatoid fungi, a new threat to cork oak stands."Present and Future of Cork Oak in Portugal (eds. Oliveira, M., Matos, J., Saibo, N., Miguel, C., Gil, L.)(2012): 87-92. 
Harrington, T. C., and S. W. Fraedrich. "Quantification of propagules of the laurel wilt fungus and other mycangial fungi from the redbay ambrosia beetle, Xyleborus glabratus." Phytopathology 100.10 (2010): 1118–1123.

External links

MycoBank

Fungi described in 2010
Ophiostomatales